"Reelin' and Rockin'" is a song written and recorded by Chuck Berry. It was originally recorded in 1957 and released as the B-side of "Sweet Little Sixteen".

Recording
The song was recorded on December 29-30, 1957 in Chicago, Illinois.
 Chuck Berry, vocals and guitar
 Johnnie Johnson on piano
 Willie Dixon on bass
 Fred Below on drums

The session was produced by the Chess brothers, Leonard and Phil.

The song was released as Chess single 1683.

A live version of the song was released in late 1972, peaking at number 27 on the US Billboard Hot 100 in early 1973. It reached number 21 in Canada and number 18 in the UK.

Charts

Dave Clark Five cover

The Dave Clark Five covered "Reelin' and Rockin'" in early 1965. The single peaked at number 24 in the UK, number 23 in the US, and number 12 in Australia. Their rendition became the first and overall highest-charting version of the song.  Cash Box described it as "a rollicking terpsichorean-themed contagious rocker."

Charts

Other cover versions
"Reelin' and Rockin'" was also covered by Gerry and the Pacemakers, the Rolling Stones, George Thorogood, Conway Twitty, Alex Harvey, and many others.

In Popular Culture
In the Philippines, the song was also used as a same title and was formerly broadcasts on IBC 13 from 1989 to 1990.

References

External links
 

Chess Records singles
Epic Records singles
Chuck Berry songs
Songs written by Chuck Berry
1957 songs
1965 singles
1972 singles
The Dave Clark Five songs
Gerry and the Pacemakers songs